Park Soo-hyun (born September 25, 1997), professionally known as Adora, is a South Korean singer, songwriter, and record producer. She made her debut as a soloist on November 5, 2021, under Aura Entertainment with the digital single "Make U Dance" featuring Eunha of Viviz and released her debut EP Adorable Rebirth in 2022.

Career

2012–2014: Early beginnings 
Adora started singing and writing songs at an early age. One of her first compositions includes a fan song she made for Highlight in 2011 at 13 years old.

She joined Stardom Entertainment as a 14-year-old trainee in 2012. She trained with Topp Dogg and co-composed their song "Playground" from their debut EP Dogg's Out released in 2013. She left the company for unknown reasons, then joined Music K Entertainment in 2014 and trained with the members of The Ark, but did not make it into the final lineup of the group.

2016–2020: Working as a music producer 
In 2016, she applied to Big Hit Music's 'Next New Creator' audition project and was selected to join the company that same year. Her first professional songwriting credit under the name Adora started with the song "Interlude: Wings" on BTS' album Wings (2016) and the singles "Spring Day" and "Not Today" on their repackage You Never Walk Alone (2017). As an in-house producer for Big Hit Music, she also co-wrote songs for TXT and GFriend. She left the company in 2020.

2021–present: Solo debut with Adorable Rebirth 
On October 25, 2021, it was announced that Adora signed an exclusive contract with Aura Entertainment. She officially debuted as a singer on November 5 with the release of the single "Make U Dance", in collaboration with Dingo Music. Although it wasn't planned at first, she decided to have Eunha featuring in her debut single because she wanted a different tone of voice on the song.

In 2021, the Recording Academy spotlighted Adora as one of the 5 K-pop songwriters and producers who 'defined 2021' by making their mark worldwide. She also named by NME, Tone Deaf, and Bandwagon as one of new artists to watch in 2022.

On March 7, 2022, Adora released the single "The Little Name" with its animated music video, which was loosely based on Antoine de Saint-Exupéry's The Little Prince.

On June 1, The single "Trouble? Travel!" was released. She had her first-ever music show performance on KBS2's Music Bank.

On July 22, Aura Entertainment confirmed that Adora would be appearing as a cast member on U+Idol Live's music variety show, Sing in the Green, which would be premiered five days later. Within the show, she released the song "Together Forever" featuring Kim Dong-hyun on August 24, 2022. Another song named "The End of Eternity" was released on September 14.

On September 26, Adora released her debut extended play Adorable Rebirth. It consisted of nine tracks, three previously-released singles and six new tracks, including an instrumental version of the lead single "Magical Symphony". She held a showcase for the release at Ilji Art Hall in Gangnam, Seoul.

Adora participated in Mnet's survival show Artistock Game, starting from October 3. She was eliminated on the eighth episode right before the semi-final round.

Personal life 
Adora revealed that she used to suffer from thyroid cancer, which later became a turning point to her life to achieve her dream of becoming a singer once again.

Discography

Extended plays

Singles

As lead artist

Promotional singles

Songwriting for other artists 
All songwriting credits are adapted from the Korea Music Copyright Association's database, unless otherwise noted.

Big Hit Music's artists

Other artists

Filmography

Television show

Web shows

References 

1997 births
Living people
Singers from Seoul
K-pop singers
South Korean women pop singers
21st-century South Korean women singers
South Korean women record producers
South Korean women singer-songwriters